Seán Kelly (1925 – 10 August 2012), also known as Seán Ó Ceallaigh, was an Irish Gaelic footballer who played at club level with Dingle and at inter-county level with the Kerry senior football team. He usually lined out as a forward.

Career

Kelly first came to prominence as a Gaelic footballer with St. Brendan's College in the Munster Colleges Championship, before later lining out at club level with Kilcummin and the Civil Service club in Dublin. His inter-county career began as a 27-year-old when he was first selected for the Kerry senior football team in 1952. Kelly won his only All-Ireland Championship title after lining out at full-forward in a defeat of Armagh in 1953. His other honours include two Munster Championship titles and inclusion on the Munster team for the Railway Cup.

Personal life and death

Born and raised in Kilcummin, County Kerry, Kelly moved to Dublin to work as a civil servant at the age of 18. Living in Clontarf, he later became Secretary-General of the Department of Posts and Telegraphs. Kelly married Eileen O'Hanrahan and they had seven children. His daughter, Fionnuala, married Enda Kenny who served as Taoiseach from 2011 until 2016. His nephew, also Seán Kelly, has served as a Member of the European Parliament.

Kelly died after a brief illness at the Bon Secours Hospital in Glasnevin on 10 August 2012.

Honours

Kerry
All-Ireland Senior Football Championship: 1953
Munster Senior Football Championship: 1953, 1954

References

1925 births
2012 deaths
Kilcummin Gaelic footballers
Kerry inter-county Gaelic footballers
Munster inter-provincial Gaelic footballers
Winners of one All-Ireland medal (Gaelic football)